George C. Tsokos is an American immunologist who is a professor of medicine at Harvard Medical School and is the chief at Division of Rheumatology and Clinical Immunology at Beth Israel Deaconess Medical Center; Boston, MA

Early life and education 

Tsokos was born in Mistros, Greece, and received his Medical Degree and a Doctorate in Sciences from the University of Athens. He trained in Internal Medicine at the University of Athens and Georgetown University/VA Medical Center in Washington DC and completed Immunology and Rheumatology Fellowships at the National Institutes of Health.   Between 1987 and 2007 he was a member of the Uniformed Services/Walter Reed community where he served in various leadership positions. In 2007 he joined the Beth Israel Medical Center as chief of Rheumatology / Clinical Immunology and Harvard Medical School as professor of medicine.

Awards and honors

 Philip Hench Award from the American College of Physicians
 Mary Kirkland Award from the Hospital for Special Surgery
 Lee C. Howley Jr. Arthritis Research Prize from the Arthritis Foundation
 Evelyn Hess award from the Lupus Foundation of America
2016 Carol Nachman international prize in Rheumatology
 2017 Marian Ropes Award from the Arthritis Foundation
2007	Master of Arts, Harvard University 
2009	Doctorate Degree, National and Kapodistrian University of Athens
2011	Doctorate Degree, University of Thessaly
2012	Doctorate Degree, University of Thessaloniki
2020	Honorary Professor of Immunology, Universidad Comlutense de Madrid

Research 
Tsokos' research has focused on the cellular and molecular pathogenesis of systemic lupus erythematosus (SLE). His research findings have opened and led the field of molecular abnormalities on immune cells in patients with SLE. Tsokos' laboratory performs biochemical, molecular biology and cellular studies of immune and kidney cells using human material and genetically engineered mice.  He has combined human and murine studies in a unique manner which involves the generation of new mice based on molecular abnormalities he identifies in patients with SLE. Molecules that are identified to contribute to immune cell malfunction are further exploited by constructing normal or lupus-prone mice engineered to express or lack each molecule to confirm their significance in vivo.  A number of targets have entered or are considered to enter clinical trials by pharma.  Tsokos has defined the molecular and biochemical abnormalities in immune cells from patients with systemic lupus erythematosus (Lupus) that have led to the identification of novel therapeutic targets, which are in various phases of clinical development

Tsokos started studying T cells in patients with SLE as a fellow at NIH and during the 1980s he was fascinated by the fact they display antithetic cell function and cytokine production patterns.  For example, they provide excessive help to B cells to produce autoantibodies they fail to raise cytotoxic responses, and although they do not produce interleukin 2 they produce excessive amounts of IL-17.  His work over the last 40 years has been guided by the simple hypothesis that biochemical, metabolic, and molecular abnormalities inside the T cell should explain the apparent dichotomy in function.  This quest has evolved in several unique but complementary projects.

T cell signaling in lupus
Tsokos is known for his contributions in discovering T cell signaling in SLE.  His work confirmed that the T lymphocytes from patients with SLE display increased and aberrant early signaling response because the T cell receptor is “rewired”.  His line of research has brought to the forefront the development of Syk and Rock inhibitors for the treatment of patients with lupus.  It has also led to the development of a T cell score and the monitoring of aggregated lipid rafts in diagnosing and monitoring SLE. More recently, a unique metabolic pathway was identified which is responsible for the decreased cytotoxic cell function of CD8 T cells.

CREM Alpha signaling in lupus
Tsokos discovered cAMP-responsive element modulator (CREM)Alpha is increased in SLE T cells, binds to the IL-2 promoter and suppresses its transcription not only by virtue of lacking transactivating domains but also by recruiting HDAC1 and closing the IL-2 locus through epigenetic modifications. Increased expression of CREM Alpha in SLE T cells is controlled through the SP1 binding to the P1 promoter; CREM expression in activated normal T cells is controlled through AP1 binding to the P1 promoter.  Interestingly, CD2-CREMa mice although do not produce IL-2, they produce increased amounts of IL-17 and this can be explained by epigenetic changes of the IL-17A  and IL-17F genes.  CREM “inspired” epigenetic modifications of the IL-2 and IL-17 loci explain the expanded effector/memory T cells in SLE patients.   His study of CREM dysregulation has provided a molecular explanation of why SLE T cells do not produce IL-2 while they produce IL17.  This line of research has encouraged the use of low dose IL-2 and of anti-IL17 blocking biologics to the treatment of lupus. CREM was found to account for the increased production of IL-17 by promoting the activity of glutaminase 1 and suppressing the activity of pyruvate dehydrogenase P2 thus revealing direct links between CREM and cell metabolism controlling enzymes.

Role of Double Negative (DN) cells in lupus
The research of Tsokos revealed that CD3 positive but CD4 and CD8 negative T cells are expanded in patients with SLE and provide help to B cells to produce anti-DNA antibodies.  In addition, they produce IL-17 and infiltrate the kidney tissue of patients with lupus nephritis.  Double negative cells appear to derive from CD8 positive cells and only when the see autoantigen.  This line of research has encouraged the engagement of many laboratories to further study DN cells and the importance of IL-17 in the development of lupus nephritis.

A treatment target Calcium Calmodulin Kinase 4 (CaMK4) in lupus
Tsokos laboratory discovered that CaMK4 is increased in SLE T cells and is responsible for the increased binding of CREMa to the IL-2 promoter.  Pharmacologic inhibition of CaMK4 results in disease prevention and reversal in lupus-prone mice. Genetic deletion of Camk4 in MRLlpr mice suppresses autoimmunity and glomerulonephritis by limiting mesangial cell proliferation and it does this by expanding Treg cells.  Importantly, CaMK4 expands Th17 cells and related pathology through the Akt/mTOR pathway.  Targeted inhibition of CaMK4 in T cells and mesangial cells holds high therapeutic value for patients with lupus nephritis.

The first Ser/Thr Phosphatase (PP2A) in Autoimmunity 
Decreased Interleukin-2 production in humans and mice with SLE is multifactorial. Decreased binding of pCREB to the IL-2 promoter is the result of increased PP2A in T cells from patients with SLE.  Increased PP2A in SLE patients can be partially explained by epigenetic changes in the PP2A promoter and an intronic SNP.  Increased PP2A was found to account for the decreased levels of pElf1 (5) which is an enhancer for CD3 and increased levels of active SP1 which is an enhancer of CREM. A CD2-PP2Ac mouse displays granulocytosis increased IL-17 levels and when challenged with anti-GBM develops florid glomerulonephritis.  The Bb’ subunit is aberrant in SLE T cells, controls IL-2 deprivation-induced cell death, and probably accounts for the prolonged survival of activated autoreactive T cells.  Furthermore, PP2A contributes to the production of IL-17.   The concept of specific subunits of PP2A controlling specific lymphocyte functions is appealing because we can consider correcting the levels of subunits to correct abnormal lymphocyte function.  In ongoing studies, we find that other subunits control IL-2 and autoantibody production.  The Deletion of PP2A in Tregs results in severe early auto/inflammatory syndrome.

Role of complement molecules in Tissue Injury, repair and regeneration 
Tsokos established the role of complement activation in tissue injury and regeneration. His findings demonstrated for the first time that significant intestinal injury occurs during ischemia prior to reperfusion and that this is due to the activation of C3 within the intestinal epithelial cells in a cathepsin-dependent manner. His work also confirmed that an anaphylatoxin molecule of complement activation “C3a” enhances intestinal stem cell expansion, organoid formation and supports intestinal regeneration. Tsokos' recent prospective study confirmed the significant correlation between injury severity score and deposition of C4d and C5b-9 in human subjects of trauma and patients with severe trauma maintain high deposition of complement components for at least 72 hours.
Recently, his group developed a novel system to culture podocytes to study kidney injury, repair, and regeneration. For the better practice of podocyte culture, Tsokos proposed a biophysical approach, termed macromolecular crowding as means to create ECM-rich tissue equivalents and decellularization to remove intracellular milieu. He provided evidence that decellularized matrix produced by human fibroblasts support podocyte in vitro microenvironment to regulate cell physiology and to develop accurate in vitro models for diagnostics and drug discovery purposes.

Honors and awards 

Tsokos has served as president of the Clinical Immunology Society and as a member or chair of multiple US Federal study sections.  He has served or serves editorial boards of dozens of scientific journals, including consulting editor of the Journal of Clinical Investigation, section editor of the Journal of Immunology and editor-in-chief of Clinical Immunology, and the European Journal of Rheumatology. He directs a National Institutes of Health-sponsored T32 training program on Systemic Autoimmunity and oversees a Fellowship in Clinical Rheumatology.  Tsokos has been elected to the Association of American Physicians, Fellow of the American Association for the Advancement of Sciences and Master of the American College of Physicians and Mater of the American College of Rheumatology.  He holds a Master of Arts (honorary) from Harvard University and honorary degrees from three more Universities. He has received several awards including the Philip Hench Award from the American College of Physicians, the Mary Kirkland Award from the Hospital for Special Surgery, the Lee C. Howley Jr. Arthritis Research Prize from the Arthritis Foundation, the Evelyn Hess award from the Lupus Foundation of America and the Distinguished Basic Investigator Award from the American College of Rheumatology. He is the 2015 recipient of the Lupus Insight Award and the 2016 Howard and Martha Holley Award from the University of Alabama, the 2016 Carol Nachman international prize in Rheumatology and the 2017 Marian Ropes Award from the Arthritis Foundation. He holds a MERIT award from the National Institutes of Health.   Tsokos is a member of the Board of Directors of the American College of Rheumatology.  He recently served as member and president of the Council of the University of Athens.

References 

  

Year of birth missing (living people)
Living people
Harvard Medical School faculty
National and Kapodistrian University of Athens alumni
American immunologists
Academic staff of the National and Kapodistrian University of Athens
People from Euboea (regional unit)